A central vacuum cleaner (also known as built-in or ducted) is a type of vacuum cleaner appliance, installed into a building as a semi-permanent fixture. Central vacuum systems are designed to remove dirt and debris from homes and buildings, sending dirt particles through piping installed inside the walls to a collection container in a remote utility space. The power unit is a permanent fixture, usually installed in a basement, garage, or storage room, along with the collection container.  Inlets are installed in walls throughout the building that attach to power hoses and other central vacuum accessories to remove dust, particles, and small debris from interior rooms.  Most power hoses have a power switch located on the handle.

History

19th century
Early steam-powered vacuum cleaners were mounted in a heavy carriage equipped with a long hose so they could be moved from one location to another, providing a specialized cleaning service by appointment. Stationary powered vacuum cleaners were built-in and centralized, due to the large and heavy machinery needed to produce the required airflow. Their high cost restricted their installation to commercial and industrial locations.

The first introduction of a permanent system similar to a residential central vacuum cleaner was in the late 19th century. A ducted machine which featured copper tubes connected from a bellows chamber, typically located in the basement and extended to several locations throughout a building, was used in a select few homes at this time.  Because of the machine’s cost and weak dust-removal capabilities, only a few of these units were ever sold in the United States.

In 1869 Ives McGaffey patented the first portable vacuum cleaner, or “sweeping machine”. Steam power was supplanted by electric motors, which were still too large and heavy for portable use, but gradually became smaller and more powerful as time went by.

20th century
By the 1930s, the development of small, powerful electric motors increased the popularity and availability of the portable vacuum cleaner, and diverted consumers from purchasing central cleaners.

By the early 1960s, the introduction of polyvinyl chloride (PVC) made a central vacuum system more affordable and popular in North America (especially Canada), by using PVC extruded pipe instead of metal tubing for the piping system inside the walls. Previously, more-expensive metal tubing was used exclusively (and it may still be used for part or all of an installation, if required by building fire code regulations). Central vacuum systems also started to become popular among European consumers interested in their hygienic and convenience benefits.

By the 1990s, central vacuum systems gained popularity among real estate agents and home remodelers for the value they added to homes at resale.  Allergists also played an important role in the growing popularity of central vacuum systems in the 1990s.

Power
The suction power of a vacuum cleaner is calculated in airwatts (or air watts)  ̶̶  not to be confused with watts, which only refers to electrical power. The airwatt value relates between the airflow, the waterlift, and power consumption. This datum is calculated as follows: P = 1/8.5 x F x S where P translates to the power in airwatts; F is the airflow in CFM; and S for the waterlift in inches. The standard airwatt formula is from ASTM International (see document ASTM F558-21). The airwatts indicate the motor's global performance, and thus the central vacuum's efficiency level.

Nowadays, the power of single motor central vacuums is usually between 500 and 800 airwatts. For central vacuums that operate with two motors, the best practice for representing the vacuum cleaner power is to prefix "2 X" in front of the power for one motor. For instance, if a central vacuum has two motors with a power of 500 airwatts each, the whole central vacuum has 2 X 500 airwatts. Airwatts cannot be added together; a unit with two motors of 500 airwatts each does not make a 1000-airwatt unit.

For central vacuums with two motors, the airflow may be connected in series or in parallel (not to be confused with the electrical connections, which are always in parallel). When two motorized blowers are connected to each other in series, both motors work together so that the air outlet of the first one is the air inlet of the second one. This configuration gives more waterlift (calculated in H₂O or mmH₂O). Waterlift measures the maximum suction force ("pressure") of the device when the hose opening is blocked. The higher the value, the heavier the objects or dense materials which can be easily vacuumed. A high suction force is usually required for deep carpet cleaning or for vacuuming liquids. 

If two motorized blowers are set up in parallel, both motors work independently. Each of them takes its airflow from the same canister but has its own air inlet and air outlet. This configuration generates more airflow volume (calculated in CFM or m³/h). Airflow indicates the amount of air vacuumed per minute or per hour with a fully opened hose. The higher the value, the greater the cleaning area that is covered by the inlet. A bigger airflow is preferable to clean hard-surfaced floors to reach dust as far as possible. Higher airflow is also desirable if multiple inlets are likely to be used at the same time.

Operation

To use a central vacuum, the vacuum hose is removed from storage and fitted with any needed cleaning accessories (such as a brush).  The other end of the hose is inserted into a wall-mounted vacuum inlet, after opening the spring-loaded cover door.   In some designs, opening the door switches on the vacuum motor; in other designs, insertion of the metallic hose-end fitting bridges two electrical contacts, signaling the motor to turn on.  Other alternative designs feature a remote on/off switch located at the tool end of the vacuum hose, which communicates either via a pair of wires embedded in the hose, or via wireless signaling.

Vacuuming is performed in the same manner as with a portable machine.  Sometimes, the higher suction power of central vacuum may require reduction (for example, when cleaning a delicate sheer fabric curtain). Excess suction is "bled off" by partially opening a bleed port or slot to let some intake air bypass the cleaning tool.  The bleed port is usually located at the tool end of the vacuum hose, to allow quick adjustment during use.

When cleaning is complete, the vacuum hose is removed from the wall inlet (which snaps shut and shuts down the vacuum motor).  The hose is coiled up and hung on a storage rack, and any cleaning accessories are stowed away.

Dirt separation

Cyclonic and filtered central vacuum systems are the two main types of central vacuums, differentiated by the method used to separate dirt and dust from the incoming airstream.
 
True cyclonic cleaners do not use filtration bags, instead separating the dirt and dust into a detachable cylindrical collection vessel or bin.  Air and dust are sucked at high speed into the collection vessel at a direction tangential to the vessel wall, creating a fast-spinning vortex.  Roughly speaking, the dust particles and other debris spiral outward to the wall of the vessel by centrifugal force, where they fall due to gravity into the bottom of the collection bin.  For a more complete technical description of this process, see the article on "Cyclonic separation".

In fixed-installation central vacuum cleaners, the cleaned air may be exhausted directly outside without need for further filtration.  A well-designed cyclonic separation system does not lose suction power due to airflow restriction until the collection vessel is almost full.  This is in marked contrast to filter bag systems, which gradually lose suction as pores in the filter become clogged by collected dirt and dust.

Filtered systems use a wide variety of different bags or filters that must be cleaned (permanent cloth bags) or replaced (disposable paper bags) on a regular basis.  Filters can be made from screening, foam, paper, or cloth, and are usually proprietary designs that may not be widely available.  Over time, repeated purchase of filters and bags can become significant ongoing expenses.

Bag breakage is an issue that arises with filtered central vacuums.  In a portable vacuum, if the filter bag fails, this condition becomes immediately obvious as a cloud of dust and dirt blows into the room.  Although it creates a mess, at least the problem can be immediately brought under control by shutting off the appliance.  By contrast, if the filter bag in a central unit should fail, little change may be noticed by the remote operator.  In fact, the only perceivable change may be an increase in suction power as a clogged but broken bag is completely bypassed.  If the filtered air is also used to cool the motor (a very typical low-cost design), the first clue that something is amiss may be when the motor completely seizes up due to dirt accumulating in the motor brushes, windings, or bearings.  Such a failure can require complete replacement of the expensive central unit.

Filterless central vacuums are completely immune to such failures. Motors of both filtered and filterless systems are usually protected by a thermal cutoff switch, which disconnects the power if the motor overheats due to blocked airflow. In addition, the best designs in either system incorporate so-called "bypass cooling", using a completely separate source of ambient air to cool the motor, rather than the cost-saving expedient of using the just-filtered dirty airflow for this vital function.

Hybrid cyclonic filtered systems have been made, which use a rudimentary cyclonic motion to separate out larger dirt particles, but rely on conventional filter bags to trap remaining finer particles. True cyclonic systems are very effective in removing all but the finest particles, which are then exhausted directly outside, completely eliminating the need for replaceable filters and their consequent airflow restrictions.  The exhaust from a good quality true cyclonic system does not contain any visible large particles, and contains far less debris than a typical clothes dryer exhaust.

Tools and accessories

Central vacuums can be equipped with either an electrical power brush or an air-driven power brush. The air-driven (or turbine) systems are frequently less expensive since they do not require electrical wires for power to be run to each wall inlet.  Turbine-driven brushes tend to be louder than electric brushes; the noise from either is more noticeable in the absence of the "vacuum whine" produced by a portable vacuum. Many users find that the high suction of central vacuums is more than sufficient by itself for most casual cleaning jobs, but reserve a powered brush tool for more difficult tasks.

The average standard central vacuum system is equipped with a 30 foot (9 m) hose, plus standard cleaning tools similar to those used with portable vacuum cleaners.  For further convenience, some owners will keep a hose and set of tools on each floor of a multi-story building. When not in use, the hose is loosely coiled around a wire rack mounted on a closet wall, or on the back of a door.

An alternative for storing vacuum hose is the "Hide-A-Hose" system, which uses suction to draw the hose into the vacuum piping in the wall for storage.  Hose lengths used are typically 30/40/50 ft (9/12/15 m). Successful installation of such systems requires special fittings, and careful design and workmanship, to ensure smooth hose retraction into the piping for storage. A scaled-down 10-foot (3 m) version (such as "Spot by Vroom") is available for quick cleaning in locations such as mud rooms and laundry rooms.  The original "Vroom" system, which is still available, uses suction to operate a cabinet-mounted hose reel with a 24 ft (7.3 m) hose, rather than storing the hose within the wall piping.

A modular vacuum hose called "QuickClick" is available in 10/15/20 foot (3/4.5/6 m) lengths, allowing a custom-length hose to be quickly set up or taken apart by an end user. In addition, a promotional article in a trade magazine says that arthritic testers were able to connect and disconnect the hose in spite of their disability.

Automatic dustpans (e.g. "Vacpan" or "KickSweep") can be installed in the kickspace under a kitchen, bathroom, or workroom countertop, enabling a person to use a standard broom to sweep debris directly into a vacuum inlet located there. Alternatively, a "DrawerVac" inlet which pulls out like a drawer from the underside of a table or counter can be used to dispose of debris from a shop or kitchen work surface.
 
The "VacnSeal" is an accessory intended to be installed on the underside of a kitchen cabinet, over a countertop used for food preparation. The nozzle of the device is used to evacuate excess air from a zipper lock plastic food storage bag (e.g. Ziploc), which is said by the manufacturer to preserve food freshness for a longer period of time.

Advantages

 Increased suction power — Because the vacuum cleaner motor and dirt collection system need not be portable, the weight and size of the unit are not as severely limited compared to a portable system; some units even use two motors for extra power.   In addition, bagless filterless systems avoid the inevitable loss of suction in filtered systems caused by collected dust clogging the filters.
 Ability to handle "difficult" debris — Central vacuums, especially filterless models, can efficiently remove difficult dry substances, such as plaster dust, spilled flour, laser printer toner, metal knockout slugs, and wire clippings from electrical work, or even small pieces and slivers of broken glass. This ability may depend on the ability of the filter bag to resist clogging or breakage; filterless models are capable of removing the widest range of materials. "Wet vacuum interceptor" accessories are available for some systems; these operate by separating liquids from the dirty airstream prior to passage into the in-wall piping and central unit. These "wet vac" units are subject to the same limitations as "wet-or-dry shop vacuums", and must be washed out and dried after use to prevent unpleasant odors and mold growth. However, toxic materials, such as asbestos should never be cleaned up with anything but specialized equipment made expressly for the purpose. 
 Complete removal of allergens and noxious odors — Central vacuums generally do not recirculate exhaust air back into the space being cleaned.  This contrasts with the well-known acrid "vacuum smell" of fine dust and hot air exhausted from a portable vacuum.  Instead, central vacuums exhaust spent air into a utility space, or directly outdoors.  An external exhaust outlet can be easily concealed under a porch or behind shrubbery, but in any case is less obtrusive than a standard clothes dryer appliance vent. Central vacuum installations can earn points for Leadership in Energy and Environmental Design (LEED) home certification, Health House certification by the American Lung Association, or the National Green Building Standard of the National Association of Homebuilders (NAHB).
 Health benefits – A study conducted in 2001 at the University of California at Davis showed improvements in multiple aspects of health in 25 individuals with a documented history of type I hypersensitivity to house dust. Each of these individuals used either a Beam Central Vacuum System or their own conventional vacuum for a period of three months. At the end of this period, the individual switched over to the opposite limb of the study for three additional months. The results showed that using a central vacuum system was superior in seven domains of evaluation, including activity, sleep, non-nasal symptoms, practical problems, nasal symptoms, eye symptoms, and emotions.
 Low acoustic noise — Well-designed central vacuums are very quiet at the point of use, since the powerful motor is located remotely in a utility space.  This is a benefit to the person vacuuming, as well as anybody else occupying the space being cleaned, who otherwise might be woken up or driven out by the loud whine of a portable machine. 
 Convenient cleaning —  Setup, use, and storage of a vacuum hose and cleaning tool can be quick and efficient.  Cleaning stairways is much easier without having to balance a heavy, hot appliance on each step, and coping with both an electrical cord and a vacuum hose.
 Infrequent emptying — Central vacuums can usually accumulate up to 10 kg (22 pounds) or more of dirt and dust before requiring disposal.  This is an unavoidable dirty process that must be performed for any vacuum cleaner, but can be done much less frequently, perhaps a few times per year.  Disposable filter bag systems are easy to empty, though care must be taken to refit the replacement bag to allow maximum airflow without leaks. Emptying the dust canister of a cyclonic vacuum is best done outdoors on a breezy day because of the fine dust cloud that can be released.
 Low consumables cost — For filterless systems, there are no ongoing costs, other than occasionally replacing a worn-out motor brush or vacuum hose.
 Compatible with standard tools and accessories — Most central vacuum hoses are compatible with a wide range of industry standard brushes and tools used with ordinary portable vacuum cleaners.  In the United States, the de facto standard size is 11/4 inch (3.175 cm) inside diameter for tools.  For some accessories, it may actually be necessary to "bleed off" excessive suction, usually by partially opening a small bleed port on the side of the vacuum hose handle, provided for that purpose.
 Reduced damage and wear to furniture and walls — There is no heavy or awkward canister or other motorized unit to carry from room to room when vacuuming.  Only a lightweight vacuum hose and the cleaning tool being used need to be carried.  To further reduce wear to furniture feet and projecting baseboard corners, a soft woven "hose sock" can be installed over the corrugated vacuum hose.
 Durable equipment — Good-quality central vacuum systems can last indefinitely, perhaps requiring replacement of the motor brushes once per decade of use. Besides using heavy-duty components, central vacuums avoid the damage caused by accidental dropping or collisions of portable equipment with fixed objects.  Many manufacturers give a "Lifetime Limited Warranty" on all permanently installed components of a central vacuum system.

Disadvantages
The chief disadvantage of central vacuums is higher initial cost.  In the United States, the average central vacuum system has an installed cost of around $1,000. This initial expense must be weighed against the long-term benefits of a central vacuum, including the typical longer service life of the equipment, and negligible consumables cost if a filterless system is chosen.

A central vacuum system is generally considered by building owners a permanent fixture of the building where it is installed, similar to plumbing and electrical fixtures. A short-term renter would most likely lose any investment made in improving the property, unless a prior agreement were to be made with the property owner. Installation of a quality central vacuum increases the property value of a residence or commercial property.

Maintenance

Central vacuum systems require periodic emptying of the dirt canister or replacing the filter bag, typically 2–4 times per year. In some models, it is also important that the filters be changed frequently, especially for designs where the just-filtered air passes through the motor for cooling.  For filtered systems, the bag may need to be replaced long before it is filled to its nominal capacity, because of reduced suction due to clogging with dirt or fine dust.

Filterless cyclonic separation systems only require emptying the dirt collection container before the suction drops off as an almost-full condition is reached.  Many cyclonic vacuum systems now feature translucent dirt collection canisters, allowing quick inspection without removing the canister.

Regardless of which dirt separation system is used, the electric motor may require lubrication of its bearings, or replacement of carbon brushes on an infrequent basis, usually measured in years.

Rarely, a central vacuum system may become clogged, especially if the piping was improperly installed, or if the system is abused by vacuuming sticky substances (such as paint or glue or wet foodstuffs).  A homeowner can usually use simple tools and techniques to locate and remove the obstruction, or can hire a professional vacuum installer to do repairs. The flexible hose is often the location of a blockage, which can usually be dislodged by using a plumber's snake.

Installation

A principal concern when designing a central vacuum system is avoiding situations likely to cause clogging of the piping with debris such as toothpicks, hairpins, needles, or similar-shaped objects.  The most important safeguard is at the vacuum inlets, which are intentionally designed with a tighter radius of curvature than any other bends in the system.  This is done to ensure that if any vacuumed debris becomes stuck, it will jam right at the inlet, where it is easiest to discover and to remove.  Well-designed central vacuum piping rarely or never clogs unless severely abused (e.g. vacuuming wet plaster, wet flour, or other sticky substances).

The wall inlets are connected to the power unit by piping which can be run inside walls, or through vertical pipe chases, closets, the attic, basement, or the cold air return ducts (if permitted by building code).  In new construction, the vacuum piping is usually installed during a "rough-in" phase once the building interior framing is complete, after other in-wall utilities (e.g. plumbing, HVAC, electrical, etc.), and just before drywall, paneling, or other surface finishes are installed.  However, there are advantages to installing vacuum piping before cabling (for electric power, telephone, Internet data, etc.), since routing of wiring is usually less constrained than piping.  In a similar manner to plumbing and electrical fixtures, the vacuum inlet fittings and final connections are installed in a finish phase, after the wall finishing is complete.

Vacuum piping systems may be installed by electricians, plumbers, specialized contractors, or even do-it-yourself (DIY) homeowners.

Retrofitting of vacuum piping in existing structures can be surprisingly straight forward or more difficult, depending on the anatomy of the building.  A home remodeling project can generate large amounts of irritating plaster dust and other demolition and construction dirt.  Installing a central vacuum early in the project makes ongoing cleanup much easier, especially if it is a filterless true cyclonic unit, which can inhale even abrasive or sharp construction debris without concerns about bag clogging or breakage.

A typical house requires 2–4 inlets per floor, although many users find the central vacuum so convenient that they later install additional inlets in the basement, attic, garage, and even on the back porch (for vacuuming car interiors, storage sheds, etc.). A rough rule of thumb is one inlet per  of floor area.  Inlets should be placed in convenient locations unlikely to be blocked by open doors or furniture, such as in central hallways. A non-stretchable cord of appropriate length (or a thin wire on an architectural scale drawing) can be used to check for adequate reach of a vacuum hose.

Routing and design of vacuum piping layout is very similar to drain-waste-vent (DWV) plumbing, with the exception that pipe pitch or gradient for drainage is not required.  Vacuum system designs share with DWV designs a concern about eliminating internal roughness, ridges, burrs, sharp turns, pockets, or other obstructions to smooth flow that might cause build-up of material into pipe blockages. Piping for central vacuums has a few peculiar constraints of its own, and a few unusual capabilities, such as the ability to run a pipe straight upwards after a sufficiently long horizontal "running start". In some jurisdictions, fire code regulations require that an intumescent firestop collar be installed around the pipe when it penetrates a firewall.  If a pipe runs through an unheated space, it may require external pipe insulation to prevent water vapor from condensing inside. These and other installation details are described in installation manuals available from manufacturers.

Two different diameters of thinwall (typically 20 gauge or "Schedule 20") plastic piping have traditionally been used in the US.  For years, HP Vacuflo advocated the slightly smaller  piping size (outside diameter), claiming that their studies showed that it was less likely to clog.  However, that manufacturer has also switched to the de facto industry standard size of  outside diameter piping and corresponding fittings.  In most cases, the end user need not be aware of the piping size in a central vacuum system, but the piping size must be considered when extending, modifying, or repairing a system.  Size adapters have been made to allow interconnection of the two sizes when necessary.

Another piping option, which is becoming popular in commercial applications and with DIYer's, is "Schedule 40" standard 2-inch plumbing pipe. The main advantage of plumbing pipe is widespread availability, slightly larger diameter, and thicker walls. The thicker material increases durability and ruggedness in installations where pipe runs are exposed to mechanical damage or abuse (although this has rarely been reported as a problem with thinwall piping). The primary disadvantage is that the thicker material makes pipe less flexible, heavier, and somewhat more difficult to work with. To use plumbing pipe for central vacuum installations, special adapters (available from many central vacuum retailers) are required to connect the plumbing pipe to the central vacuum inlets and power unit.

Occasionally, the owner of a new house under construction may choose to preinstall vacuum piping and control wiring in the walls, but to defer purchase of the central unit, hose, and tools to reduce cash flow requirements. Installing piping and wiring for a central vacuum in new construction is definitely much easier if done before the drywall and other wall finishes. The short-term cost savings of deferring full system completion should be weighed against the great convenience of having a functional vacuum system, especially during the commissioning and move-in period, which generate more than the usual amount of debris to be cleaned up.

See also 

 List of vacuum cleaners
 Pneumatic refuse conveying system — larger central vacuum systems used to dispose of industrial or municipal rubbish

References 

Vacuum cleaners
Home appliances